Rangwapithecus is an extinct genus of ape from the Early Miocene of Kenya. Late Miocene phalanges from Hungary have also been assigned to this genus, but were later reclassified as Dryopithecus.

Description
An arboreal ape from the earliest Miocene adapted to life in the rainforest, it is associated particularly with Mfangano Island although the species previously inhabited a woodland-bushland environment.

Taxonomy
Rangwapithecus was sympatric with Proconsul, and may be synonymous with both Proconsul gordoni and Proconsul vancouveringi. It is also similar to another species found in Africa. Rangwapithecus gordoni and P. africanus are similarly sized though they differ morphologically, and both are restricted to Koru and Songhur.

Notes

References

External links

 

Prehistoric apes
Miocene primates of Africa
Prehistoric primate genera
Cenozoic mammals of Africa
Fossil taxa described in 1974